Puma Automóveis Ltda., or simply Puma, is a Brazilian manufacturer of sports cars and small trucks that began its activities in 1963 as Lumimari (named after the initials of its founders and partners: Luiz Roberto Alves da Costa, Milton Masteguin, Mario Cezar de Camargo Filho and Rino Malzoni) which later became Puma Veículos e Motores the following year and ten years later, in 1974, as Puma Indústria de Veículos SA.

The brand ceded the production rights for a limited time to several companies, including the Brazilian companies: Araucária Veículos Ltda and later to Alfa Metais Veículos Ltda, and also to a company in South Africa in the following years: 1973–1974, 1989–1991 and 2007 until 2014, when the production rights for Puma models expired.

The company was revived in 2013 under the Puma Automóveis Ltda name, headquartered in the countryside of São Paulo, by a former industrial director of Puma Indústria de Veículos S/A. New projects include the Puma P-052 (a prototype made especially for motorsports), and the Puma GT Lumimari, named in honor of the company's original title.

History

Puma began on the tracks and a dream of the Italian designer and immigrant, naturalized in Brazil, Rino Malzoni, of designing and manufacturing a vehicle with a fiberglass body and mounting this body on the platform of a passenger vehicle with a modified engine and suspension to perform better and add a finish compatible with a sports car.

This dream motivated Malzoni to create a prototype of a racing car, which was developed on his farm in Matão, in the interior of São Paulo. It had the support of Vemag, which supplied mechanics and chassis, with the intention of unseating Willys at the Autodromo de Interlagos, in addition, the prototype had a front DKW engine, 3 cylinders of 981 cm³ and weighed 720 kg. This prototype had 5 wins at Interlagos in 1964 and won the main races the following year.

With the enormous success of the model and several victories in various competitions, in the same year the first vehicle was launched, Sociedade de Automóveis Lumimari Ltda was founded by several car enthusiasts, Luiz Roberto Alves da Costa (LU) Milton Masteguin (MI) ), Mário César de Camargo Filho (MA) and Rino Malzoni (RI), having their first model named GT Malzoni in honor of the creator and principal involved in the brand. In 1966 the brand was renamed to Puma Veículos e Motores Ltda at the suggestion of the head of the competition department at Vemag, Jorge Lettry.

Also in 1966, Puma participated in the Motor Show and presented its newest model, the Puma GT, known by many as the Puma DKW, which was for the most part an improvement on the GT Malzoni, as it used the same bodywork and corrected some problems of the first and added some new features, in total about 125 units were produced, until Vemag was bought by Volkswagen in 1967. In the same year, Puma was renamed Puma Indústria de Veículos SA, becoming a publicly traded company.

Being in a very complicated situation, as he had lost his only chassis and engine supplier, Rino Malzoni spent 9 months working on his farm to create a new vehicle to try to rebuild his company, he then used Karmann-Ghia chassis from VW, with some modifications and also used a 1500 cm³ rear mechanical set, also from Volkswagen. This then became one of Puma's most successful models, being produced between 1967 and 1970 and helping the company's growth and consolidating the brand.

In 1969, Puma made a limited edition of its sports cars to be drawn in Quatro Rodas magazine, one of the most important magazines in the automotive world in the country, the model in question was the Puma GT4R, in which only 3 were produced for the draw , in copper, blue and green; later on, another model was made, this one for Malzoni.

In 1970, Puma launched its most successful car to date, the Puma GTE, (E for “Export”), a sports car to be distributed around the world, being sold to several countries in the world, such as countries in Europe, Asia , Africa and the American continent. The Puma GTE was an updated version of the Puma GT, having its design reformulated, updated and complying with the traffic laws of each country where it was ordered; in addition, in 1971 the Puma Spyder was launched, a convertible and modified version of the Puma GTE, both vehicles having mechanics and VW components; years later, in 1976, the models were updated and released again.

Still in 1971, Puma began to manufacture truck cabins for Chevrolet in the background. Years later, in 1978, Puma decided to launch its own truck model, called the 4T, years later the Puma 6T model was launched and in 1981 the Puma 2T model and buses were also made with chassis of its trucks.Three years later, in 1974 the Puma GTB was launched, (Gran Turismo Brasil), a car based on the design of the limited Puma GT4R, Mustang and also the Opala, it was a car that had been in development since 1971, but which was released years ago later to have its design reformulated, it was one of the most expensive cars of the time, but it was a great success between the year of its launch, until 1987. In 1978, the Puma GTB S2 was launched, an updated version for the new era of the years. 1980s that were to come, with a more modern, more powerful and larger design, now leaving aside the chassis of the Karmann-Ghia and starting to use the chassis from Brasília, also from Volkswagen.

The founder and creator of the brand, Rino Malzoni, died at the age of 62, in 1979.In 1980 two models emerged, the Puma GTI and the Puma GTC, both being a re-styling of the Puma Spyder, with the GTC being the convertible version of the Puma GTI, these vehicles kept Brasília chassis and became part of the new era Puma models with new chassis and they being improved versions of the old models.

In the early 1980s the company was experiencing financial and structural difficulties, as it had suffered fires in its factories, with this crisis, the company saw a way out to revive one of its classics. Based on the GTI, Puma began developing a design for a new model, called the P-016, which would have its own chassis, a modern suspension and a water-cooled engine, but because of its high cost, it was cancelled. In parallel with the P-016, the project of the P-018 was made, which would also have a new body, but keeping the chassis and mechanics of VW, this project had great inspirations in the GTB S2 model. The P-018 was released in 1981, but due to its problems, Puma ended up ceding its rights for a limited time in November 1985 to Araucária Veículos, a company from Paraná, which continued the production of the Puma models.

A few years later, in 1988, Alfa Metais Veículos Ltda bought Araucária Veículos and acquired the rights of Puma and also continued with the new models, but those with some design modifications and an Opal engine, these models did not please the buyers. In 1990, a major partner of the company, Nívio de Paula, died in an accident, causing even more problems for the company. Puma sports vehicles continued to be produced until 1993, until it was discontinued and Alfa Metais Veículos remained active. with the manufacture of buses and trucks.

In 1991 the truck 914 was launched, which was based on the 4Q, but with further improvements and also remaining a large cargo truck; in 1994 the brand launched the 9000 Turbo Power truck, which is a much more powerful truck with a better design and resolution of the brand until that moment; in 1996 Puma launched its latest project, the 7900 CB, a cabin version little different from the 9000 Turbo Power and which was soon discontinued. Alfa Metais Veículos stopped the production of Puma trucks and vehicles in 1999, with this, the rights of the brand returned to Puma Indústria de Veículos SA.

In 2007, Puma based in Durban, South Africa, began manufacturing the Puma GT model, with Volkswagen components, in limited quantities. Puma had already ceded its production rights in the country years before, in 1972 and 1989.

Resurgence 
Puma returned to activity in 2013 initially with the partnership of two enthusiastic entrepreneurs: Fernando Mesquita and Reginaldo Galafazzi, who created the Mesgaferre Automobile Society. In November 2014, when the Puma brand turned 50 years old. Afterwards the name was definitively changed to Puma Automóveis Ltda (new official name of the company) announced the creation of a prototype model of the brand for P-052 racing. The car is inspired by the former GT model, Lotus Elise and Porsche boxers.

The new model would be manufactured with lines inspired by the classic Puma “shark” GTE and with a fiberglass body, as well as a central-rear engine and tubular structure. The main idea was to produce a batch of 25 to 30 cars to create its own automobile category, sponsored by Jan Balder, director of competitions at Puma and former driver, partner of Emerson Fittipaldi in the legendary Thousand Miles of 1966, driving a GT Malzoni. The prototype was presented at the end of 2016 in the last stage of the São Paulo Automotive Championship, at the Autodromo de Interlagos, in São Paulo. The track category has not yet been completed, but Puma has created the approved version for the streets. The new Puma is named GT Lumimari in honor of the company's original 1963 name.

Historic 

 In 1964 The GT Malzoni model gave rise to a sequence of models that sought to follow the trends in design and mechanical technology of each period, and also allowed production to adapt to the availability of suppliers and parts.
 In 1966 the Puma GT (DKW) appeared, it was basically the GT Malzoni with aesthetic touches.
 In 1968, the Karmann Ghia 1500 platform replaces the DKW platform, whose manufacture was discontinued after the acquisition of DKW by Volkswagen.
 In 1970 the Puma GT is renamed Puma GTE.
 In 1971, a convertible model, called Puma GTE Spider, is launched.
 In 1973 a new body was launched, although it was very similar, it was improved in detail. The convertible was renamed Puma GTS.
 In 1974 the Puma GTB was launched, using the Chevrolet Opala platform.
 In 1976, there was a new platform change for the GTE and GTS models, with the Volkswagen Brasília vehicle being used.
 In 1980, three novelties were announced: the P-018 model was launched, the GTE model was renamed GTI and the GTS model was renamed GTC.
 In 1986, as a result of financial difficulties, Puma leased its brands and molds for a limited time to Araucária Veículos, which would manufacture a small number of vehicles.
 In 1988 the production of the Puma models was transferred to Alfa Metais, which produced the AM1, AM2, AM3, AM4 and AMV models.
 In 1995, the last car with the Puma brand was sold, an AM4 Spyder.
 In 1999, the last truck with the Puma brand, model 7900, was sold.
 in 2013 Puma Automóveis Ltda was created to continue the brand's history, being the current holder of the rights to the Puma brand, granted by Puma Indústria de Veículos S/A.

Vehicles produced 

 Puma GT (DKW) (1967) (VW) (1968-1970)
 Puma GT4R (1969-1970) (Special series)
 Puma P8 (1971)
 Puma Spyder (1971-1972)
 Puma GTE (1970-1980)
 Puma GTS (1973-1980)
 Puma GTB (1974-1979)
 Puma GTB S2 (1979-1987)
 Puma GTB S3 (1984-1984)
 Puma GTB S4 (1984-1984)
 Puma P-018 (1981-1987)
 Puma GTC (1981-1986)
 Puma GTI (1981-1987)
 Puma AM1 (1988-1990)
 Puma AM2 (1988-1990)
 Puma AM3 (1989-1991)
 Puma AM4 (1989-1995)
 Puma AMV (1988-1991)
 Puma 7900 (Truck)
 Puma GT P-052 (2013 - currently)
 Puma GT LUMIMARI (2017- currently)

Production

Production per year 

 Brazil

 South Africa

Production by country

Production by model 

 Brazil

References

Further reading

External links

Company history at RitzSite

Vehicle manufacturing companies established in 1967
Defunct motor vehicle manufacturers of Brazil
Car manufacturers of South Africa
Car manufacturers of Brazil
Truck manufacturers of Brazil
Companies based in São Paulo (state)
Rear-wheel-drive vehicles
Rear-engined vehicles